Alison Matthews is a Canadian actor, voice artist, and coach. A founding faculty member at the Arts Club Actor's Intensive Training Program, she was also a faculty member for five years with the Citadel Banff Professional Theatre Program at the Banff Centre for the Arts in Alberta. As Head of Coaching for Vancouver's Bard on the Beach Shakespeare Festival, she has coached over 40 productions since 2007. As a voice and speech trainer, she works with academics at the Peter Wall Institute for Advanced Studies at the University of British Columbia, with women at the Vancouver Chapter of The Shoe Project, and with community leaders at Leadership Vancouver Island. For the past twenty years she has adjudicator for competitive speech festivals across Western Canada.

Matthews has numerous film and television credits, including roles on The X-Files and Battlestar Galactica, as well as featured roles in films such as Disney's Snow Dogs, and Final Destination 2. Matthews has voiced several anime roles, most notably Ezalia Joule in Gundam SEED, as well as the narrator in Gundam SEED and Gundam SEED Destiny. She also co-starred in NBC Saturday morning series Just Deal.

Matthews holds a M.F.A. in Theatre from the University of British Columbia, and an Associate Diploma in Drama & Speech from Trinity College London.

Filmography

Film

Television

External links

Canadian film actresses
Canadian television actresses
Canadian voice actresses
Living people
20th-century Canadian actresses
21st-century Canadian actresses
Year of birth missing (living people)
Place of birth missing (living people)